The Hazrat Sultan Mosque is a Friday mosque in Astana, Kazakhstan.

Construction
After the suggestion from president of Kazakhstan Nursultan Nazarbayev  mosque named "Hazret Sultan", which means "Holy Sultan". As well known, "Hazret Sultan" - one of the epithets of Sufi sheikh Khoja Ahmed Yasavi, author of "Divan-i Hikmet", whose mausoleum is located in Turkistan.

Construction of the mosque "Hazret Sultan" started in Astana in June 2009. In different periods from 1000 to 1500 workers have been involved in the construction of the mosque. Hazret Sultan Mosque was opened on July 6, 2012 at 12:30, which supplemented the list of unique objects of the capital.

Overview
The building was constructed in classical Islamic style with traditional Kazakh ornaments. Located on the right bank of the Yesil river the Mosque is adjacent to the Palace of Peace and Reconciliation, the monument "Kazakh Eli" and the Independence Square. It can accommodate five thousand worshipers, and on holidays - up to 10 thousand people. The area of the mosque across more than 11 hectares and construction area of 17,700 square meters. Hazret Sultan has the largest dome in Kazakhstan with the height of 51 meters and a diameter at the base of the dome 28.1 meters. The mosque also has eight small domes with diameters of 10.45 and 7.6 meters, and peaks - 33.46 and 25, 25 meters. 4 minarets with the height of 77 meters are located in the corners of the mosque. According to the architectural plan, the temple should crown the 80-meter spire with a crescent directed strictly towards Mecca. As the functionality of the object, it may be noted that the building provides space for bathing ritual and wedding, halls to read the Koran and sitting in educational groups.

See also
 Islam in Kazakhstan

References

2012 establishments in Kazakhstan
Mosques completed in 2012
Mosques in Astana